Eslamabad-e Olya, Lorestan may refer to:

 Eslamabad-e Olya, Khorramabad
 Eslamabad-e Olya, Pol-e Dokhtar